The discography of New Model Army, a British rock band which formed in 1980, consists of fifteen studio albums, four live albums, eleven compilation albums, four extended plays and twenty singles, which were released by Abstract Records, EMI Records, Epic Records and Attack Attack Records, as well as seven video albums.

Studio albums

Live albums

Compilation albums

Extended plays

Other album appearances

Singles

Video albums

References

Rock music group discographies
Discographies of British artists